Diyanet TV is a Turkish television station owned and operated by Presidency of Religious Affairs of Turkey. It has a relationship with other local television stations and broadcasts some local news bulletins from 81 provinces of Turkey. It evolved from TRT Anadolu that closed down in 2014 at 12:00 AM EEST and was rebranded as 
TRT Diyanet.

External links

Television stations in Turkey
Television channels and stations established in 2009
2009 establishments in Turkey
Religious television stations in Turkey
Islamic television networks